Westmorland (formerly also spelt Westmoreland; is a historic county in North West England spanning the southern Lake District and the northern Dales. It had an administrative function from the 12th century until 1974. Between 1974 and 2023 Westmorland lay within the administrative county of Cumbria. In April 2023, Cumbria County Council will be abolished and replaced with two unitary authorities, one of which, Westmorland and Furness,  will cover all of Westmorland (as well as other areas), thereby restoring the Westmorland name to a top-tier administrative entity.  The people of Westmorland are known as Westmerians.

Early history

Background
At the beginning of the 10th century a large part of modern day Cumbria was part of the Kingdom of Strathclyde, and was known as  "Scottish Cumberland" .
The Rere Cross was ordered by Edmund I (r.939-946) to serve as a boundary marker between England and Scotland ( "Scottish Cumberland" ).

County of Westmorland
At the time of Domesday Book in 1086, the county did not exist; half was considered to form part of Yorkshire and the other half as part of Scotland. Before 1226, the Barony of Kendal was part of the Honour of Lancaster while the Barony of Westmorland was part of the Earldom of Carlisle, the latter became Cumberland and was part of Scotland at times.

Both baronies became a single county of Westmorland in 1226/7. Neighbouring Lancashire was also formed at this time.  Appleby was the historic county town, having been chartered in 1179.  It was a parliamentary borough from 1295-1832, and incorporated by letters patent in 1574.

Geography
The historic county boundaries are with Cumberland to the north, County Durham and Yorkshire to the east, and Lancashire to the south and west. Windermere forms part of the western border with Lancashire north of the sands, and Ullswater part of the border with Cumberland.

Division into wards
Westmorland was subdivided into the two baronies of Westmorland (or sometimes Appleby) and Kendal. As with Cumberland, Durham and Northumberland it was divided into wards. The baronies were each further subdivided into two wards:

Westmorland
East ward – Appleby, Brough, Kirkby Stephen, Orton, Tebay
West ward – Askham, Bampton, Barton, Patterdale, Shap, Yanwath
Kendal
Kendal ward – Ambleside, Burton-in-Kendal, Grasmere, Grayrigg, Kentmere, Kendal, Windermere
Lonsdale ward – Kirkby Lonsdale

Modern history
In 1889, under the Local Government Act 1888, a county council was created for Westmorland, taking functions from the quarter sessions. The county council was based at Kendal, rather than the historic county town of Appleby.  Kendal had been chartered as a municipal borough in 1835,  Appleby in 1885.  The county had no county boroughs throughout its history, so the administrative county, the area under the control of the county council, was coterminous with the geographic county.

Aside from the two municipal boroughs of Kendal and Appleby, the Local Government Act 1894 divided the county into urban districts and rural districts:
Five urban districts: Ambleside, Bowness on Windermere, Grasmere, Kirkby Lonsdale, Windermere
Three rural districts: West Ward, East Westmorland, South Westmorland
In 1905 a new Shap urban district was formed, while Windermere absorbed the neighbouring Bowness UD.

A County Review Order in 1935 reduced the number of districts in the county: 
A new Lakes Urban District was formed by the merger of Ambleside and Grasmere UDs and adjacent parishes in West Ward and South Westmorland RDs
East Westmorland RD, most of West Ward RD and Shap UD were merged to form North Westmorland Rural District
South Westmorland RD absorbed Kirkby Lonsdale UD, at the same time losing an area to Lakes UD.

Despite their title, many of Westmorland's urban districts, such as Lakes, Grasmere, and Shap, were quite rural in character.

According to the 1971 census, Westmorland was the second least populated administrative county in England, after Rutland. The distribution of population was as follows:

In 1974, under the Local Government Act 1972, the county council was abolished and its former area was combined with Cumberland and parts of Lancashire and Yorkshire to form the new county of Cumbria, administered by a new Cumbria County Council. The area forms parts of the districts of South Lakeland and Eden.

In July 2021 Robert Jenrick, Secretary of State for Housing, Communities and Local Government announced the dissolution of Cumbria County Council and its six district councils and their replacement in April 2023 by two unitary authorities: Cumberland, and Westmorland and Furness. The latter will re-unite and re-establish historic Westmorland within a single administrative unit, along with the Furness (Lancs), Penrith (Cumberland) and Sedbergh (Yorks) areas.

Naming 
J. E. Marr explains the name "Westmorland" thus:

The name applied to the district by the Anglo-Saxons was originally Westmoringaland, 'the land of the people of the western moors,' in distinction from that of the people of the eastern moors, on the east side of the  Pennine chain. The present name has not, however, been derived from that of Westmoringaland, but from Westmarieland or Westmerieland, used in the twelfth century, hence Westmerland. The meaning of this is land of the western meres, and not moors. Mere means boundary as well as a lake, and it is doubtful whether the word as used here refers to lakes or boundaries. There is no doubt that Westmerland is the more correct spelling [...].

Coat of arms
The College of Arms granted the Westmorland County Council a coat of arms in 1926. The design of the shield referred to the two components of the county: on two red bars (from the arms of the de Lancaster family, Barons of Kendal) was placed a gold apple tree (from the seal of the borough of Appleby, for the Barony of Westmorland). The crest above the shield was the head of a ram of the local  Herdwick breed. On the ram's forehead was a shearman's hook, a tool used in the handling of wool. The hook was part of the insignia of the borough of Kendal, the administrative centre of the county council.

Legacy

From April 2023, Westmorland will reappear on national maps as part of Westmorland and Furness unitary authority. During the intervening period, Westmorland has still been used as a place name by organisations and businesses in the area such as:
The Westmorland Gazette (founded 1818)
The Westmorland County Agricultural Society (founded 1799), which organises the annual Westmorland County Agricultural Society Show
The Westmorland County Football Association, the regional division of the Football Association that administers many football leagues including the Westmorland Association Football League.
The Westmorland Geological Society (formed 1973)
The Cumberland and Westmorland Antiquarian and Archaeological Society (founded 1866)
The Westmorland Youth Orchestra
The Westmorland Shopping Centre, Kendal
The Westmorland Cricket League
Westmorland Motorway Services, the company behind Tebay services in Westmorland and Gloucester Services.
In 1974 the successor parish council formed for the former borough of Appleby adopted the name Appleby-in-Westmorland.
Westmorland General Hospital in Kendal
Westmorland croquet club

The southern part of the county, the former Barony of Kendal or that part of Westmorland that is part of South Lakeland, is included in the Westmorland and Lonsdale parliamentary constituency.

In June 1994, during the 1990s UK local government reform, the Local Government Commission published draft recommendations suggesting that Westmorland's border with Yorkshire and Lancashire be restored for ceremonial purposes. The final recommendations, published in October 1994, did not include such recommendations, apparently due to lack of expression of support for the proposal to the commission.

In September 2011, the Westmorland Association, a local society which promotes the county's identity, successfully registered the Flag of Westmorland with the Flag Institute.

In 2013, the Secretary of State for Communities and Local Government, Eric Pickles, formally recognised and acknowledged the continued existence of England's 39 historic counties, including Westmorland.

In April 2023, local government in Cumbria will be reorganised into two unitary authorities, one of which is to be named Westmorland and Furness and would cover all of the historic county along with parts of historic Yorkshire, Lancashire and Cumberland.

Notable people
 Sir Thomas Strickland carried the Flag of St. George at the battle of Agincourt.
 St. John Boste, Roman Catholic priest and martyr
 Mary Wakefield, patron of music celebrated with annual Mary Wakefield Festival
 Nicholas Freeston (1907–1978), award-winning Lancashire poet, born in Kendal
 George Romney, portrait painter, many paintings by him at Kendal Town Hall
 William Parr, 1st Baron Parr of Kendal, who was father to Sir Thomas Parr of Kendal and thus the grandfather of Queen Catherine Parr, Henry VIII's sixth wife. The Parrs' ancestral castle, Kendal Castle, is located in Kendal.
 Tom Barker, trade unionist and socialist, born in Crosthwaite
 Margaret Cropper, poet
 Mary Rolls, poet

See also
 List of Lord Lieutenants for Westmorland
 List of High Sheriffs for Westmorland
 Custos Rotulorum of Westmorland – List of keepers of the Rolls
 Westmorland (UK Parliament constituency) – List of MPs for constituency of Westmorland
 Västmanland – Swedish historic county

References

Notes

Citations

Sources

External links
The Westmorland Association
Westmorland County Agricultural Society
Map of Westmorland on Wikishire

History of Cumbria
Geography of Cumbria
Counties of England established in antiquity
Counties of England disestablished in 1974
Former counties of England